The Family Holvak is a 1975 American television series.

Plot
Tom Holvak, a small town minister in Bensfield, Tennessee, struggles to keep his family afloat and maintain his congregation's faith during the Great Depression.

Episodes

References

External links
 
 

1970s American drama television series
1975 American television series debuts
1975 American television series endings
Television series by Universal Television
NBC original programming
Great Depression television series
Period family drama television series
Evangelical drama television series
Television shows set in Tennessee